The Newark by-election was a by-election in the Newark constituency of the British House of Commons, which was held on 5 June 2014, following the resignation of  Patrick Mercer. Conservative Robert Jenrick won the seat with a majority of 7,403.

Background
Mercer resigned the Conservative Party whip on 31 May 2013 after an investigation by the BBC's Panorama programme regarding allegations of paid lobbying without registering the interest. He was paid £4,000 for asking questions in Parliament, and the Panorama team considered that he asked five parliamentary questions, but declared only £2,000 of the £4,000. As a consequence, he said at the time that he would not stand in the 2015 general election.

On 29 April, after being told that the Committee on Standards would recommend that he be suspended from the House of Commons for six months, Mercer announced that he would resign his seat: he told journalists on College Green that he was standing down from "God's county of Nottinghamshire". Mercer was appointed Steward and Bailiff of the Three Chiltern Hundreds on 30 April 2014, a mechanism by which MPs resign.

The writ was moved on 1 May 2014 for the by-election to be held on 5 June.

Candidates 
The nominations closed at 4pm on Tuesday 13 May with 11 candidates being nominated.

The local Conservative Party had already selected Robert Jenrick to fight the seat. Jenrick trained as a solicitor and is a director of Christie's auction house. He is married with two children.

Labour selected 27-year-old councillor Michael Payne, a former students' union president and current deputy leader of Gedling Borough Council.

The Liberal Democrats chose David Watts, leader of Broxtowe Borough Council.

Nigel Farage was immediately interviewed on the evening of 29 April and said he was "tempted" to stand, but the next morning he ruled himself out. UKIP instead announced that outspoken former Conservative and current UKIP MEP for the East Midlands Roger Helmer would stand in the by-election.

The Bus Pass Elvis Party leader and perennial election candidate, David Bishop, announced on 6 May that he would stand in the by-election after taking fourth place ahead of the Liberal Democrats in a recent local authority by-election in Clifton North ward, Nottingham.

Result

The Conservatives retained the seat with a majority of over 7,000 which was described by the BBC as 'a relatively comfortable victory'. While UKIP's performance decreased the Conservative majority the BBC's Alex Forsyth said this was 'not as much as Mr Farage had hoped - or predicted'. Christopher Hope, writing in The Daily Telegraph, argued that 'the scale of the victory is a vindication for the Tory high command which mounted a huge effort to win the seat' and claimed that David Cameron 'had halted the momentum of Ukip'. George Osborne hailed his party's victory and noted that it was the first time the Conservative's had held a seat at a by-election while in government for 25 years. However, both Nigel Farage and Labour's Chris Bryant suggested that the Conservative performance was not particularly impressive. It was suggested by Owen Jones in The Guardian that "Labour and Lib Dem voters clearly voted tactically to keep Ukip out". The poor performance for the Liberal Democrats was described by the BBC as one of 'worst performances in a post-war English by-election' for the party or its predecessors, and by The Telegraph as 'a disaster' for the party.

Polling

Previous result

See also

1943 Newark by-election
2014 United Kingdom local elections
2014 European Parliament election in the United Kingdom
List of United Kingdom by-elections
Opinion polling for the next United Kingdom general election
Opinion polling for the next United Kingdom general election in individual constituencies

Notes

Newark by-election
Newark by-election
Newark by-election
2010s in Nottinghamshire
Newark and Sherwood
By-elections to the Parliament of the United Kingdom in Nottinghamshire constituencies